Admiral Muhammad Zakaullah  (Urdu: محمد ذكاءالله ; born 10 January 1958) is a retired admiral in the Pakistan Navy, who was the 15th Chief of Naval Staff of the Pakistan Navy. He was later replaced by Admiral Zafar Mahmood Abbasi.

He is noted for his sportsmanship, having represented Pakistan at the Olympics for a sailing class category, for which he is a recipient of a national honor.

As naval chief, Admiral Zakaullah is noted for revolutionizing the role of the navy, emphasizing the role of the navy in economic corridor with China and took initiatives to strengthened ties with the Turkish Navy. He also played an active role in establishing the very low frequency facility to provide communications with the submarines as well as ensuring the second-strike capability by commissioning the cruise missile system in the strategic command of the Navy.

Biography

Early life and career in Navy
Muhammad Zakaullah was born in Lyalpur (now Faisalabad) in Punjab, Pakistan on 10 January 1958 to a Arain Family. After graduating from the Cadet College Hasan Abdal, he joined the Pakistan Navy in 1975 where he was sent to join the Pakistan Naval Academy, graduating at top of his class and conferred with coveted Sword of Honour and awarded the chief of the naval staff gold medal at his graduation. Sub-Lieutenant Zakaullah gained commissioned in the Operations Branch, and was sent to United Kingdom for his training and education later his career.

He attended and did his military training from the Royal Naval Staff College, and later attended the London University where he gained MA in Defence studies. He also a attended and graduated from the Quaid-e-Azam University, having attained the MSc in War Studies.

Upon returning to Pakistan, he joined the faculty of and National Defence University to teach war studies.

War and staff appointments

Zakaullah qualified as a surface officer from the United Kingdom, serving first in the Babur which he later commanded as Commander. He also served as a military attaché at the Pakistan Embassy, Doha in Qatar. Captain Zakaullah served as the Directing Staff at the Pakistan Naval War College before taken as secondment by the President Musharraf.

From 1999 till 2003, Commodore Zakaullah tenured as the Director-General of the National Accountability Bureau, before taking over the command of the 25th Destroyer Squadron. His other command appointments included his role as Chief Inspector of Naval Police and military secretary to Prime Minister Shaukat Aziz for a short brief of time. Rear-Admiral Zakaullah also commanded the CTF–150 in Arabian Sea to guard off operations on Somalian piracy.

At the Navy NHQ, he was appointed as ACNS (Plans), DCNS (Training and Personnel), and DCNS (Operation).

Vice-Admiral Zakaullah's last war assignment included command of the Pakistan Fleet as its senior commander.

On the height of border escalation with India, he reportedly responded to the incident to media that, Pakistan has ability to answer the disturbance of border.

In an emergency address to the media representatives at the ISPR directorate, he quoted to the media that "Pakistan forces are prepared for any critical situation." Answering the question of Indian Army's further capabilities, Admiral Zakaullah said that Pakistan was not concerned due to New Delhi's ground capability as it had the ability to defend itself against any aggression.

Chief of Naval Staff

In 2014, Vice-Admiral Zakuallah was promoted to four-star rank admiral.

Sportsmanship

He is a keen yachtsman and has represented Pakistan at numerous international events, including 1984 Olympics and Asian Games of 1986 and 1990. He has won Gold medal at the Asian Games twice. He is also a recipient of President's Award for Pride of Performance for outstanding performance in yachting.

Awards and decorations

Foreign Decorations

References

External links

CTF 150 Handover ceremony
Naval Chief Admiral Zakaullah conferred US Legion of Merit

 

1958 births
Living people
People from Faisalabad
Pakistan Naval Academy alumni
Alumni of the University of London
Quaid-i-Azam University alumni
Academic staff of the National Defence University, Pakistan
Academic staff of Pakistan Naval War College
Pakistani sportsmen
Pakistani male sailors (sport)
Olympic sailors of Pakistan
Asian Games medalists in sailing
Sailors at the 1984 Summer Olympics – 470
Sailors at the 1986 Asian Games
Sailors at the 1990 Asian Games
Medalists at the 1986 Asian Games
Medalists at the 1990 Asian Games
Asian Games gold medalists for Pakistan
Pakistan Navy admirals
Cadet College Hasan Abdal alumni
Pakistani military attachés
Chairmen of the National Accountability Bureau